Reiver José Sanmartín (born April 15, 1996) is a Colombian professional baseball pitcher for the Cincinnati Reds of Major League Baseball (MLB). He made his MLB debut in 2021.

Career

Texas Rangers
Sanmartin signed as an international free agent with the Texas Rangers on July 2, 2015. Sanmartin spent the 2016 and 2017 season with the DSL Rangers of the Rookie-level Dominican Summer League; going 0–1 with a 5.23 ERA over  innings in 2016, and 7–1 with a 2.35 ERA and 56 strikeouts over  innings in 2017. He split the 2017 season between the Spokane Indians of the Class A Short Season Northwest League and the Hickory Crawdads of the Class A South Atlantic League, going a combined 7–2 with a 2.45 ERA and 56 strikeouts over 66 innings.

New York Yankees
On November 20, 2017, Sanmartin was traded to the New York Yankees in exchange for Ronald Herrera. Sanmartin split the 2018 season between the Staten Island Yankees, the Charleston RiverDogs, the Tampa Tarpons, and the Trenton Thunder. Between the four levels, he posted a combined 5–7 record with a 2.81 ERA and 58 strikeouts over  innings.

Cincinnati Reds
On January 21, 2019, Sanmartin and Sonny Gray were traded to the Cincinnati Reds in exchange for Shed Long Jr. and draft pick compensation. Sanmartin split the 2019 season between the Daytona Tortugas, and the Chattanooga Lookouts, going a combined  4–12 with a 4.05 ERA and 114 strikeouts over  innings. He did not play in 2020 due to the cancellation of the Minor League Baseball season because of the COVID-19 pandemic. Sanmartin split the 2021 minor league season between Chattanooga and the Louisville Bats, going a combined 10–2 with a 3.32 ERA and 112 strikeouts over  innings.

On September 27, 2021, Sanmartin’s contract was selected to the active roster to make his MLB debut versus the Pittsburgh Pirates.

References

External links

1996 births
Living people
Sportspeople from Cartagena, Colombia
Major League Baseball players from Colombia
Major League Baseball pitchers
Cincinnati Reds players
Dominican Summer League Rangers players
Spokane Indians players
Hickory Crawdads players
Staten Island Yankees players
Charleston RiverDogs players
Tampa Tarpons players
Trenton Thunder players
Indios de Mayagüez players
Daytona Tortugas players
Chattanooga Lookouts players
Louisville Bats players
Colombian expatriate baseball players in the Dominican Republic
Colombian expatriate baseball players in Puerto Rico
Colombian expatriate baseball players in the United States
2017 World Baseball Classic players
2023 World Baseball Classic players